Live in L.A. is the seventh album by the American Jazz group The Rippingtons, released in 1992 for the GRP label. It is the group's first live album. The album reached No. 6 on Billboard's contemporary jazz chart.

Live in L.A. was recorded on consecutive nights at the Majestic Ventura Theatre and at the Greek Theatre on September 25–26, 1992.

Track listing
All tracks composed by Russ Freeman.
"Indian Summer" - 5:19
"Aspen" - 5:55
"Curves Ahead" - 4:49
"Weekend in Monaco" - 5:44
"One Summer Night in Brazil" - 5:12
"Highroller" - 6:59
"Introduction of the Band" - 1:33
"Morocco" - 5:03
"Dream of the Sirens" - 5:22
"Tourist in Paradise" - 6:50

Personnel 

The Rippingtons
 Russ Freeman – acoustic guitar, classical guitar, electric guitar, guitar synthesizer, horn arrangements 
 Mark Portmann – keyboards
 Kim Stone – bass
 Tony Morales – drums
 Steve Reid – percussion
 Jeff Kashiwa – saxophones, EWI controller, horn arrangements (1, 2, 6)

Guest Musicians
 David Benoit – acoustic piano (4, 10)
 Paul Carman – alto saxophone
 Wendell Kelly – trombone 
 Matt Fronke – trumpet
 Carl Anderson – vocals (10)

Production
 Russ Freeman – producer, mixing 
 Dave Grusin – executive producer
 Larry Rosen – executive producer 
 Carl Griffin – associate executive producer, mixing 
 Don Murray – recording engineer
 Joseph Doughney – post-production editing
 Michael Landy – digital editing, post-production editing
 Adam Zelinka – post-production editing
 Ted Jensen – mastering 
 Sharon Franklin – production assistant 
 Diane Dragonette – production coordinator 
 Michael Pollard – production coordinator 
 Sonny Mediana – production director
 Andy Baltimore – creative director 
 Scott Johnson – art direction 
 Dan Serrano – art direction
 Alba Acevedo – graphic design 
 Jackie Salway – graphic design 
 Bill Mayer – front cover illustration 
 Masato – photography 
 Lucia Castaneda – hair, make-up 
 Andi Howard – manager

Studios
 Mixed at Cheyenne Mountain Ranch Studios (Colorado).
 Edited at The Review Room (New York City, New York).
 Mastered at Sterling Sound (New York City, New York).

Charts

References

External links
The Rippingtons Live in L.A. at AllMusic
The Rippingtons Official Website

1992 live albums
The Rippingtons albums
GRP Records live albums
Albums recorded at the Greek Theatre (Los Angeles)